Sweden was represented by the group Friends in the Eurovision Song Contest 2001 with schlager song "Lyssna till ditt hjärta". It was written by Thomas G:son and Henrik Sethson.

Before Eurovision

Melodifestivalen 2001 
Melodifestivalen 2001 was the selection for the 41st song to represent Sweden at the Eurovision Song Contest. It was the 42nd time that this system of picking a song had been used. 
Around 1,800 songs were submitted to SVT for the competition, of which 10 were chosen to compete in the show. The final was held in the Malmö Musikteater in Malmö on 23 February 2001, presented by Josefine Sundström and Henrik Olsson, and was broadcast on SVT1. The winners were the previous year's runner-up, the group Friends with the schlager song "Lyssna till ditt hjärta". It was written by Thomas G:son and Henrik Sethson.

Competing entries

Final

At Eurovision 
For the ESC, the song was rewritten into English and got the new title "Listen to Your Heartbeat". It was performed in the 7th spot on the night of the contest, following Russia and preceding Lithuania. Despite not receiving any 12s, Sweden scored 100 points at the close of voting, finishing in 5th position.

Controversy 
After the song "Lyssna till ditt hjärta" won Melodifestivalen 2001, it was accused of plagiarism from the 1996 Belgian entry "Liefde is een kaartspel". At first this was denied by the Swedish composers, Thomas G:son and Henrik Sethsson, but after the Belgian songwriters and the author's organisation SABAM pressed for legal action, a cash settlement was agreed.

Voting

References

External links 
TV broadcastings at SVT's open archive

2001
Countries in the Eurovision Song Contest 2001
2001
Eurovision
Eurovision